The Cedar sculpin (Cottus schitsuumsh) is a small, large-headed species of freshwater ray-finned fish belonging to the family Cottidae, the typical sculpins. This species is found in the Coeur d'Alene and St. Joe rivers in northern Idaho, and in a stretch of the Clark Fork river in western Montana. It is a common species of streams with cobble and gravel bottoms and cool to cold water.

References

Cottus (fish)
Freshwater fish of the United States
Fish described in 2014